The Diocese of Vinh is a Roman Catholic diocese in central Vietnam. The Most Reverend Alphonse Nguyễn Hữu Long was appointed bishop on December 22, 2018.

The diocese covers an area of 16,499 km2, and is a suffragan diocese of the Archdiocese of Hanoi.

Assumption Cathedral at Xã Đoài in Nghi Diên commune is the cathedral of the diocese.

History
The circuit (trấn) of Nghệ An was evangelized by Jesuit missionaries as early as in 1629, especially by Girolamo Maiorica. After the Apostolic Vicariate of Tonkin (Đàng Ngoài) was created in 1659, MEP missionaries were assigned to Nghệ An trấn. In 1846, the Vicariate of South Tonkin (Nam Đàng Ngoài) was established, covering the area of Nghệ An and Hà Tĩnh provinces as well as northern Quảng Bình province. It has been renamed Vinh in 1924 and elevated to a diocese in 1960. In 2006, the other part of Quảng Bình province, south of Gianh River and Son River, was officially transferred from Archdiocese of Huế to the Diocese of Vinh after decades under Vinh's de facto supervision following the Partition of Vietnam. After being split to establish the Diocese of Hà Tĩnh in 2018, the Diocese of Vinh currently covers Nghệ An Province only.

References

Vinh
Religious organizations established in 1846
Vinh
Roman Catholic dioceses and prelatures established in the 20th century
Vinh, Roman Catholic Diocese of
1960 establishments in North Vietnam